Brand New Me is the seventh studio album released by American country music artist John Michael Montgomery. His last album for the Atlantic label, it features the Number One single "The Little Girl" (the last Number One of his career) as well as "Even Then" and "That's What I Like About You", both of which failed to make Top 40.

"That's Not Her Picture" was previously cut by Jason Sellers on his 1999 album A Matter of Time, and "Thanks for the G Chord" was originally recorded by Canadian artist Gil Grand on his 1998 album Famous First Words.

Brand New Me was certified Gold by the RIAA.

Track listing

Personnel
Melonie Cannon – background vocals (tracks 2, 9)
J. T. Corenflos - electric guitar (all tracks)
Chad Cromwell - drums (all tracks)
Blair Daly - background vocals (track 10)
Glen Duncan - fiddle (tracks 1-6, 9), mandolin (tracks 2, 4, 5)
Kim Fleming - background vocals (track 9)
Larry Franklin - fiddle (tracks 1, 7, 8, 10)
Paul Franklin - steel guitar (track 7), Dobro (tracks 2, 4)
Wes Hightower - background vocals (tracks 1, 2, 4-6, 9)
John Hobbs - piano (tracks 2-5), Hammond B-3 organ (tracks 6, 8)
Garnet Imes - background vocals (track 9)
Alison Krauss - background vocals (track 8)
Troy Lancaster - electric guitar (track 1)
B. James Lowry - acoustic guitar (track 10)
Liana Manis - background vocals (track 9)
Brent Mason – electric guitar (track 3)
Randy McCormick - piano (tracks 6, 9, 10), keyboards (tracks 2-5), Hammond B-3 organ (tracks 1, 4, 7)
John Michael Montgomery - electric guitar (track 10), lead vocals (all tracks)
Steve Nathan - keyboards (tracks 8, 10)
Bobby Ogdin - piano (tracks 1, 7), Hammond B-3 organ (track 10)
Dale Oliver - electric guitar (all tracks)
Larry Paxton - bass guitar (all tracks)
Scotty Sanders - lap steel guitar (track 1)
Dan Tyminski - mandolin (track 8), background vocals (tracks 2, 4, 6, 8)
Tommy White - steel guitar (all tracks except 7)
John Willis - acoustic guitar (all tracks except 10)
Dennis Wilson - background vocals (tracks 1, 3, 5, 7, 10)
Curtis Young - background vocals (tracks 3, 7, 10)

Charts

Weekly charts

Year-end charts

References

2000 albums
Atlantic Records albums
John Michael Montgomery albums
Albums produced by Buddy Cannon
Albums produced by Norro Wilson